Rebecca Trehearn is an actress, best known for her work in musical theatre. She trained at Mountview Academy of Theatre Arts, graduating in 2004.

Career 
In 2013, she played Molly in the UK tour of Ghost the Musical. In 2014 she played Marcy in the Southwark Playhouse production of Dogfight.

She won the 2017 Laurence Olivier Award for Best Actress in a Supporting Role in a Musical for her performance as Julie LaVerne in Show Boat, which played at the New London Theatre. She had previously played the role at the Sheffield Crucible prior to the West End transfer.

References

External links
 
 

Living people
Laurence Olivier Award winners
British musical theatre actresses
Alumni of the Mountview Academy of Theatre Arts
Year of birth missing (living people)